"I Got Ants in My Pants (and I Want to Dance)" is a funk song by James Brown. Recorded in 1971 and released as a two-part single in November 1972 or January 1973, it charted #4 R&B and #27 Pop. It did not receive an album release. A remixed version was included on the 1988 compilation album Motherlode, Part 1 to Star Time and the whole cut again in Make It Funky: The Big Payback.

Later uses
The song was sampled in the 1973 break-in record, "Super Fly Meets Shaft" (US #31).

A guitar riff from this song was sampled by Public Enemy on their track "Don't Believe the Hype" from the album It Takes a Nation of Millions to Hold Us Back.

References

James Brown songs
Songs written by James Brown
1972 singles
Songs about dancing